Damiano Giulio Guzzetti (born 15 July 1959), is an Italian-born Roman Catholic priest who serves as Bishop of the Roman Catholic Diocese of Moroto, in Uganda, since 20 February 2014.

Background and priesthood
Guzzetti was born on 15 July 1959, in the town of Lombardy, in the Roman Catholic Archdiocese of Milan, in northern Italy. He professed as a Member of Comboni Missionaries of the Heart of Jesus, on 25 May 1985. He took the	Perpetual Vows of the Comboni Missionaries on 27 March 1989. He was ordained a priest on 23 September 1989. He served as a priest of the Comboni Missionaries of the Heart of Jesus until 20 February 2014.

As bishop
He was appointed Bishop of Roman Catholic Diocese of Moroto on 20 February 2014	and was consecrated a bishop at Moroto on 24 May 2014 by Archbishop Emmanuel Obbo, Archbishop of Tororo, assisted by Bishop Henry Apaloryamam Ssentongo, Bishop Emeritus of Moroto and Archbishop Michael August Blume, Titular Archbishop of Alexanum.

Succession table at Moroto

References

External links
 Profile of the Roman Catholic Diocese of Moroto

1959 births
Living people
21st-century Italian Roman Catholic priests
21st-century Roman Catholic bishops in Uganda
Italian Roman Catholic bishops in Africa
Roman Catholic bishops of Moroto